Diego Schwartzman was the defending champion, but he retired in the first round against Pablo Cuevas.

Laslo Đere won the title – the first of his career – defeating Félix Auger-Aliassime in the final, 6–3, 7–5. No seeded players reached the quarterfinals, and only one seed (João Sousa) won his first-round match.

Seeds

Draw

Finals

Top half

Bottom half

Qualifying

Seeds

Qualifiers

Lucky loser
  Carlos Berlocq

Qualifying draw

First qualifier

Second qualifier

Third qualifier

Fourth qualifier

References

External Links
 Main draw
 Qualifying draw

Rio Open - Singles
2019 in Brazilian tennis
Rio Open